The men's 200 metres event at the 2002 Commonwealth Games was held on 28–29 July.

Medalists

Results

Heats
Qualification: First 4 of each heat (Q) and the next 4 fastest (q) qualified for the quarterfinals.

Wind:Heat 1: +0.5 m/s, Heat 2: +1.3 m/s, Heat 2: 0.0 m/s, Heat 4: +0.3 m/s, Heat 5: +0.7 m/s, Heat 6: +0.3 m/s, Heat 7: +0.3 m/s

Quarterfinals
Qualification: First 4 of each heat qualified directly (Q) for the semifinals.

Wind:Heat 1: +0.8 m/s, Heat 2: +0.5 m/s, Heat 2: +1.3 m/s, Heat 4: –0.4 m/s

Semifinals
Qualification: First 4 of each heat qualified directly (Q) for the final.

Wind:Heat 1: +0.4 m/s, Heat 2: +0.4 m/s

Final
Wind: +1.4 m/s

References
Official results
Results at BBC

200
2002